Richard Thompson Ford is George E. Osborne Professor of Law at Stanford Law School. His scholarship includes work on critical race theory, local government law, housing segregation, and employment discrimination. He has served as a housing commissioner for the San Francisco Housing Commission, and continues to work with local governments on issues of affordable housing and segregation. His book Rights Gone Wrong: How Law Corrupts the Struggle for Equality was chosen as one of the New York Times 100 Notable Books of 2011.

He graduated with a BA from Stanford University in 1988 and a JD from Harvard Law School in 1991.

Selected publications 
 Dress Codes. Simon & Schuster, 2021. 
 Universal Rights Down to Earth. New York: W.W. Norton & Co, 2011. 
 Rights Gone Wrong: How Law Corrupts the Struggle for Equality. New York: Farrar, Straus and Giroux, 2011. 
 The Race Card: How Bluffing About Bias Makes Race Relations Worse. Macmillan, 2008. 
  Racial Culture: A Critique (Princeton University Pr., 2005).
  "The Boundaries of Race: Political Geography in Legal Analysis." Harvard Law Review (1994): 1841-1921.
 "Beyond "Difference" : A Reluctant Critique of Legal Identity Politics" in: Left legalism/left critique. Eds. Wendy Brown, and Janet Halley. Duke University Press, 2002. 
 "Geography and Sovereignty: Jurisdictional Formation and Racial Segregation." Stanford Law Review (1997): 1365-1445.

References

External links
 Biography. Stanford University. Retrieved June 16, 2016.

Stanford Law School faculty
African-American lawyers
Year of birth missing (living people)
Living people
Stanford University alumni
Harvard Law School alumni
21st-century African-American people